Tkeshelashvili is the Georgian surname, which may refer to:

Vaso Tkeshelashvili, Mtavari esaa
David Tkeshelashvili, Georgian politician
Eka Tkeshelashvili, Georgian politician
Nino Tkeshelashvili, Georgian writer and feminist
Sofiko Tkeshelashvili, Georgian chess player, woman grandmaster
Zaza Tkeshelashvili, Georgian  Freestyle wrestler

Georgian-language surnames